Justin Renfrow (born November 23, 1989) is an American gridiron football offensive tackle for the Jacksonville Sharks of the National Arena League (NAL). He has previously played for the Florida Blacktips and Hudson Valley Fort of the Fall Experimental Football League (FXFL).

High school
Renfrow played defensive end and Tight End at William Penn Charter School.

College
Renfrow played defensive end for Virginia before switching to play at Miami (FL).

Professional career

Arizona Cardinals
Renfrow went undrafted in 2014. He and 11 other Cardinals players were released on August 25, 2014.

Green Bay Packers
On November 25, 2014, Renfrow signed with the Green Bay Packers of the National Football League (NFL). On December 30, 2014, Renfrow was released by the Packers.

Seattle Seahawks
Renfrow switched positions to offensive tackle. He signed a contract with the Seattle Seahawks. He signed a future contract along with 10 other teammates, but was released after.

San Francisco 49ers
Renfrow signed a contract with San Francisco 49ers on May 18, 2015 along with Michigan State's Mylan Hicks. He was released on September 5, 2015 in order for the 49ers to make their 53-man roster.

Buffalo Bills
On June 17, 2016, Renfrow signed with the Buffalo Bills.

Calgary Stampeders
Renfrow signed with the Calgary Stampeders on May 19, 2017 and dressed in six games during the 2017 CFL season. He played in only one game in 2018, but was a member of the 106th Grey Cup championship team that year. He spent the first seven weeks of the 2019 CFL season on the practice roster.

BC Lions
On July 28, 2019, Renfrow was traded to the BC Lions.

Edmonton Eskimos/Elks
Renfrow was released by the Edmonton Elks on January 9, 2021, but re-signed on July 3, 2021.After the 2021 season, Renfrow's contract was not renewed and he become an unrestricted free agent. The Elks re-signed Renfrow to the practice roster on June 22, 2022.

Jacksonville Sharks
On February 1, 2023, Renfrow signed with the Jacksonville Sharks of the National Arena League (NAL).

References

External links
Miami Hurricanes football bio

1989 births
Living people
American football offensive tackles
Canadian football offensive linemen
American players of Canadian football
Miami Hurricanes football players
Arizona Cardinals players
Seattle Seahawks players
San Francisco 49ers players
Virginia Cavaliers football players
Blacktips (FXFL) players
Hudson Valley Fort players
Buffalo Bills players
Players of American football from Philadelphia
Players of Canadian football from Philadelphia
Green Bay Packers players
Calgary Stampeders players
BC Lions players
Edmonton Elks players